Pierce Liam Sweeney (born 11 September 1994) is an Irish professional footballer who plays as a defender for  side Exeter City.

Career

Schoolboy Football 
Sweeney began his career at Ardmore Rovers in his hometown of Bray, before moving on to the under-13 level with Belvedere.

Bray Wanderers 

In 2012, Sweeney joined League of Ireland Premier Division side Bray Wanderers. He made 12 appearances for the Seagulls during the 2012 season.

Reading 
On 6 July 2012, Sweeney signed with then-Premier League side Reading. Although he was a member of Reading's Under 21 2013-14 Premier League Cup-winning side, on 9 May 2016, Sweeney was released by Reading without having made a first-team appearance for the club.

Exeter City 
On 22 July 2016, Sweeney signed with Exeter City as the 1931 Fund fan-funded player after a successful trial. He scored two goals and an assist in Exeter's 5–1 defeat of Notts County on 8 September 2018, and had already scored two additional goals before the end of September 2018.

Swindon Town 
On 11 June 2021, Sweeney signed a two-year deal with Swindon Town to begin on 1 July 2021, after rejecting an offer from Exeter City. His contract was terminated by mutual consent on 2 July 2021, with Sweeney stating that 'due to family circumstances at this current moment I am unable to fulfil relocating to be part of the team'.

Exeter City return
Following his abrupt departure from Swindon, Sweeney returned to Exeter City on 8 July 2021. He was vice-captain as Exeter secured a return to League One for the first time since 2012. In June 2022, Sweeney signed a new two-year deal with the club.

On 14th January 2023, in his first match as club captain following the departure of Matt Jay, Sweeney made his 300th appearance for Exeter in all competitions.

International career 
Sweeney has represented the Republic of Ireland at under-U17, under-U19, and under-U21 levels.

Career statistics

Honours

Club 
Reading
Premier League Cup: 2013–14

Exeter City
League Two runner-up: 2021–22

Individual 
FAI Under-19 Irish International Player of the Year: 2013

References

External links

1994 births
Living people
Association footballers from County Dublin
Republic of Ireland association footballers
Republic of Ireland under-21 international footballers
League of Ireland players
Republic of Ireland youth international footballers
English Football League players
Association football defenders
Belvedere F.C. players
Bray Wanderers F.C. players
Reading F.C. players
Exeter City F.C. players
Swindon Town F.C. players
Republic of Ireland expatriate association footballers